Keng Hau is one of the 41 constituencies in the Sha Tin District in Hong Kong.

The constituency returns one district councillor to the Sha Tin District Council, with an election every four years.

Keng Hau constituency is loosely based on part of the public estates Hin Yiu Estate and Hin Keng Estate, villages Ha Keng Hau, Sheung Keng Hau, and private housing estates Parc Royale and Julimount Garden, with an estimated population of 19,588.

Councillors represented

Election results

2010s

2000s

1990s

References

Sha Tin
Tai Wai
Constituencies of Hong Kong
Constituencies of Sha Tin District Council
1994 establishments in Hong Kong
Constituencies established in 1994